Archbishop of Tirana, Durrës and All Albania or simply Archbishop of Albania (Albanian: Kryepeshkopi i Tiranës, Durrësit dhe gjithë Shqipërisë) is the primate of the Orthodox Autocephalous Church of Albania. He is also head of the Holy Synod.

The first archbishop was Visarion Xhuvani. The current archbishop is Anastasios of Albania.

List of archbishops of Albania

References

Sources

External links
 rulers.org (It reports: "© 1995-2005 B. Schemmel. Data from this site may be queried and copied on a not-for-profit basis only if the source is accurately credited. All rights are reserved for profit-seeking purposes.")

Religion in Tirana
Tirana